Avivi Zohar (born December 4, 1972) is an Israeli former footballer. He spent a large portion of his career with Maccabi Jaffa in Israel. At international level, Zohar was capped for the Israel national under-21 football team. He is the younger brother of Israel international player Itzik Zohar, who also played for Jaffa, but left for neighbors Maccabi Tel Aviv.

Honours
Toto Cup (Artzit) (2):
1991–92,1992–93
Liga Gimel (1):
2008–09

References

1972 births
Living people
Israeli footballers
Maccabi Jaffa F.C. players
Hapoel Haifa F.C. players
Hapoel Ashkelon F.C. players
Hapoel Beit She'an F.C. players
Hakoah Maccabi Amidar Ramat Gan F.C. players
Liga Leumit players
Israel under-21 international footballers
Footballers from Bat Yam
Association football midfielders
Israeli football managers